Asmus Jacob Carstens (or "Jakob", May 10, 1754May 25, 1798) was a Danish-German painter, one of the most committed artists of German Neoclassicism.  His career was erratic, partly because of his difficult personality, and the majority of his large projects were left incomplete, or subsequently destroyed. Much of what survives is in the form of drawings, many using "a schematic, pale colouring as a timid and humble accessory to the dominating figure-drawing", that were planned for large fresco commissions that never materialized.

Biography
He was born in Sanct Jürgen near Schleswig to a miller. He had a youthful passion for painting, but was apprenticed to a cooper (barrel-maker) for five years. After quitting his master in 1776, he went to Copenhagen, where he studied at the academy and supported himself for seven years by drawing portraits in red chalk, producing during the time a large historical picture, the "Death of Æschylus", and another painting, "Æolus and Ulysses". In 1783 he went to Italy where he was much impressed by the work of Giulio Romano. His means did not permit him to go beyond Milan and Mantua, where he remained a month and then went to Lübeck, where he lived five years painting portraits.

He was then introduced by the poet Overbeck to a wealthy patron, by whose aid he went to Berlin, where his "Fall of the Angels", a colossal picture containing over 200 figures, gained him a professorship in the academy of fine arts. Two years' labour in Berlin and a travelling pension enabled him in 1792 to go to Rome, and study the works of Michelangelo and Raphael. At the end of this time he made a strongly worded attack on the Prussian academy and was dismissed; he was based in Rome for the brief remainder of his life, where he developed his final style.

He gradually produced some fine subject and historical paintings, e.g. "Plato's Symposium" and the "Battle of Rossbach" which made him famous. He was appointed professor at Berlin, and in 1795 a great exhibition of his works was held in Rome in the studio of Pompeo Batoni; he died in Rome in 1798. He mostly designed in pencil or chalk and watercolour and painted paintings in fresco; he rarely painted in oil.

A biography was published in 1806 by his friend, the critic and archaeologist Karl Ludwig Fernow, who was later the royal librarian at Weimar, which has the best collection of his graphic work.  Bertel Thorvaldsen and Joseph Anton Koch both studied and worked with him in Rome, and copied many of his works; Koch made etchings of several, which were published in Rome in 1799.  The Thorvaldsens Museum has several works by all three artists based on Carstens' designs.

Selected works

Notes

References

 Fritz Novotny, Painting and Sculpture in Europe, 1780-1880, 2nd edition. (reprinted 1980)

External links
 

1754 births
1798 deaths
18th-century German painters
18th-century German male artists
German male painters
18th-century Danish painters
18th-century male artists
Danish male painters
Danish people of German descent
People from Schleswig, Schleswig-Holstein
People from the Duchy of Schleswig
Burials in the Protestant Cemetery, Rome